Donna Kurtz is an American classicist specializing in Greek art.  Born in Cincinnati, Ohio, she took her BA at the University of Cincinnati and her MA as a Woodrow Wilson Scholar at Yale.  She read for a DPhil at Somerville College of the University of Oxford with a Marshall Scholarship, which she received in 1968 with her thesis The iconography of the Athenian white-ground lekythos under the supervision of Martin Robertson.  This formed the partial basis for her first individual monograph, Athenian white lekythoi: patterns and painters, a standard reference work for the white-ground lekythos.

After the death of Sir John Beazley in 1970, Kurtz organised his books, papers, notebooks, drawings and photographs to form the Beazley Archive, initially kept at the Ashmolean Museum, and was named Beazley Archivist, a chair created for her.  The post is connected to Wolfson College, where she remains a fellow. As Professor of Classical Art at the University, she lectured and tutored until her retirement in 2011.

Her scholarly output, especially in the first decades of her career, focussed on Greek pottery.  Collaborations with Sir John Boardman on Greek Burial Customs and Brian Sparkes (edd.) on The Eye of Greece: studies in the art of Athens expanded the topics on which she wrote.  Her interest in the work of Beazley produced several articles and a posthumous collaboration in The Berlin Painter, which uses Beazley's drawings as the basis of study of anatomy and connoisseurship.  From 2000, with the publication of The reception of classical art in Britain: an Oxford story of plaster casts from the antique and the Reception of classical art: an introduction, she has moved into the history of collections more fully.

Digital projects 

From 1979, the Beazley Archive was digitized, in collaboration with IBM and others.  Put on-line in 1998, it was one of the earliest large data-sets available; as the Classical Art Research Centre (CARC) it now contains over 100,000 records.

In 2000, Kurtz launched CLAROS, the Classical Art Research Online Services, an umbrella that included the Beazley archive as well as similar archives and research centres across Europe.  In 2007, she upgraded the database using semantic web technologies, in collaboration with the Oxford e-Research Centre (where she is now a senior researcher) and the Oxford Internet Institute (where she is now a research associate); the site  went live in 2011.  It includes not only the original data from the Beazley Archive but also records of eastern ceramics, eastern and western sculpture, gems, drawings and photographs.

From 2013, Kurtz has helmed the Oxford Cultural Heritage Programme, a collaboration between several divisions, incorporating conservation, commerce and law.

References 

Year of birth missing (living people)
Living people
American classical scholars
Women classical scholars
Fellows of Wolfson College, Oxford
Yale University alumni
Alumni of Somerville College, Oxford